The 1972 United States Senate special election in Vermont took place on January 7, 1972. Incumbent Republican Robert Stafford, appointed in September 1971 to fill the vacancy created by the death of Winston L. Prouty, successfully ran for election to the remainder of Prouty's term in the United States Senate. Stafford defeated Democratic candidate Randolph T. Major. Liberty Union candidate Bernie Sanders received 2% of the vote and was later elected to this seat in 2006 as an independent.

General election

Results

See also 
 1972 United States Senate elections

References

Vermont 1972
Vermont 1972
1972 Special
Vermont Special
United States Senate Special
United States Senate 1972
Bernie Sanders